The 2011 Nigerian Senate election in Niger State was held on April  11, 2011, to elect members of the Nigerian Senate to represent Niger State. Zainab Abdulkadir Kure representing Niger South, and Dahiru Awaisu Kuta representing Niger East both won on the platform of People's Democratic Party (Nigeria), while Ibrahim Musa representing Niger North won on the platform of the Congress for Progressive Change

Overview

Summary

Results

Niger South 
People's Democratic Party (Nigeria) candidate Zainab Abdulkadir Kure won the election, defeating Congress for Progressive Change candidate Aminu Babba and other party candidates.

Niger East 
People's Democratic Party (Nigeria) candidate Dahiru Awaisu Kuta won the election, defeating Congress for Progressive Change candidate Inuwa Zakari and other party candidates.

Niger North  
Congress for Progressive Change candidate Ibrahim Musa won the election, defeating Congress for Progressive Change candidate Nuhu Labbo Aliyu and other party candidates.

References 
 

April 2011 events in Nigeria
Nig
Niger State Senate elections